Christmas Music is a compilation album of phonograph records put together for the Christmas season by Decca Records in late 1940. The album features the most popular artists recording for Decca such as: Bing Crosby, Kenny Baker, Men About Town and Eddie Dunstedter. It features Bing Crosby's first commercial release of "Silent Night", the 1942 version of which went on to sell 30 million copies.

Track listing
The 1940 album issue Decca Album No. 159 consisted of these previously issued 78 rpm records:

Disc 1: (304)

Disc 2: (621)

Disc 3: (2189)

Disc 4: (2190)

References

Bing Crosby compilation albums
1940 Christmas albums
Christmas albums by American artists
Decca Records compilation albums
1940 compilation albums